Norm Trerise (born 3 June 1947) is a Canadian middle-distance runner. He competed in the men's 1500 metres at the 1968 Summer Olympics.

References

1947 births
Living people
Athletes (track and field) at the 1968 Summer Olympics
Athletes (track and field) at the 1970 British Commonwealth Games
Canadian male middle-distance runners
Olympic track and field athletes of Canada
Place of birth missing (living people)
Commonwealth Games competitors for Canada